The women's tournament in volleyball at the 2018 Asian Games was the 18th edition of the event at an Asian Games, organised by the Asian Volleyball Confederation in conjunction with the OCA. It was held in Jakarta, Indonesia from 19 August to 1 September 2018.

Squads

Results
All times are Western Indonesia Time (UTC+07:00)

Preliminary

Pool A

Pool B

Classification for 9–11

Semifinals for 9–11

Classification 9–10

Final round

Quarterfinals

Semifinals for 5–8

Semifinals

Classification 7–8

Classification 5–6

Bronze medal match

Gold medal match

Final standing

References

External links
Volleyball at the 2018 Asian Games
 Asian Games 2018 | Volleyverse
 Six important questions on the Philippines-Thailand match | Volleyverse

Volleyball at the 2018 Asian Games